ESPN Radio 1430 may refer to:

 ESPN Radio 1430 serving the Altoona, PA market
 ESPN Radio 1430 serving the Fresno, CA market
 ESPN Radio 1430 serving the Blacksburg, VA market